The Arlington-Washington Breeders' Cup Lassie Stakes is an American Thoroughbred horse race held annually in mid September at Arlington Park Racetrack in Arlington Heights, Illinois. Raced on Polytrack synthetic dirt over a distance of seven furlongs, it is open to Two-Year-Old Fillies and currently offers a purse of $75,000.  It was a Grade III race through 2012, but was a listed stakes in 2013.

Inaugurated in 1929 as the Arlington Lassie Stakes, in 1963 it was renamed the Arlington-Washington Lassie Stakes and in 2005 was given the Breeders' Cup designation.

Since inception, the race has been contested at various distances:
 1929–1931 : 5.5 furlongs
 1932–1961 & 1972–1979 : 6 furlongs
 1962–1969 : 6.5 furlongs
 1980–1984 & 1986–1987 : 7 furlongs
 1985 : 6.5 furlongs (at Hawthorne Race Course)
 1986–2013 : 1 mile
 2014 to present : 7 furlongs

The race was not run in 1970, 1971, 1988, 1995, 1998 and 1999.

Records
Time record: (at one mile distance)
 1:35.93 – Original Spin (2005)

 Largest winning margin:
 12 lengths – Eliza (1992)

Most wins by an owner:
 4 – Calumet Farm (1937, 1943, 1947, 1949)

Most wins by a jockey:
 5 – Steve Brooks (1949, 1952, 1954, 1959, 1960)

Most wins by a trainer:
 2 – Ben A. Jones (1938, 1943)
 2 – Howard Wells (1942, 1950)
 2 – J. Hodgins (1946, 1952)
 2 – Horace A. Jones (1947, 1949)
 2 – Harry Trotsek (1951, 1953)
 2 – Moody Jolley (1954, 1959)
 2 – Joe Pierce Jr. (1969, 1972)
 2 – Woody Stephens (1983, 1984)
 2 – Michael L. Reavis (1994, 2010)

Winners

References

1929 establishments in Illinois
Horse races in Illinois
Arlington Park
Flat horse races for two-year-old fillies
Recurring sporting events established in 1929